The 1923 George Washington Hatchetites football team was an American football team that represented George Washington University as an independent during the 1923 college football season. In their third season under head coach William Quigley, the team compiled a 2–8 record.

Schedule

References

George Washington
George Washington Colonials football seasons
George Washington Hatchetites football